Cuban-born American singer Camila Cabello has received multiple nominations and won more than 136 awards including as a member of American girl group Fifth Harmony. This includes wins for six American Music Awards, two Billboard Music Awards, two Latin Grammy Awards, seven MTV Video Music Awards and nominations for two Brit Awards and four Grammy Awards.

Her debut album Camila was released in 2018 and debuted at No.1 on the US Billboard 200 Chart. The album spawned a No.1 single "Havana" and a top 10 single "Never Be the Same" on Billboard Hot 100. In August, she was presented Artist of the Year at the 2018 MTV Video Music Awards, and won a MTV Video Music Award for Video of the Year for "Havana", the video directed by Dave Meyers. In October, she won New Artist of the Year at the 46th Annual American Music Awards, plus Collaboration of the Year, Video of the Year and Favorite Pop/Rock Song. In November, she was presented International Breakthrough of the Year at the NRJ Music Awards. The same year, she has also won a Billboard Music Award, four American Music Awards, five MTV Europe Music Awards, two MTV Video Music Awards, an NRJ Music Award two iHeartRadio Music Awards, and three iHeartRadio Much Music Video Awards.  

In December 2018, Cabello was nominated for two awards at the 61st Annual Grammy Awards, including Best Pop Vocal Album for Camila, and Best Pop Solo Performance for the live version of "Havana", becoming her first two nominations. Cabello was also nominated for International Female Solo Artist at the 2019 Brit Awards. 

Cabello alongside Shawn Mendes took home two VMAs at the 2019 MTV Video Music Awards for their single Señorita - including Best Collaboration and Best Cinematography.

In September 2019, Cabello was nominated for three awards at the 20th Annual Latin Grammys for "Mi Persona Favorita", her collaboration with Alejandro Sanz. 
Late November she won Record of the Year and Best Pop Song.

Awards and nominations

Notes

References

Cabello, Camila
Cabello, Camila
Awards